The Permanent Cure is an Irish folk group. The songs commute between Irish folk, bluegrass, country and roots music.

History 

The Permanent Cure was formed in 1976 on St. Stephen's Green in Dublin, Ireland. The band's members were George Kaye, who was singer/songwriter, was playing on fiddle and on guitar, Dermot O'Connor, who was singer/songwriter, was playing on mandolin and on guitar, Leo Gillespie, who was singer/songwriter, was playing on guitar and blues harp and Pat Gibbs, who was singer, and was playing on clarinet, saxophone, piano and chromatic harmonica. They appeared on prime time in Irish Television (also in Gay Byrne's Late Late Show) and played in Dublin, Cork and Galway.

With the unique music and the humor, between madness and typical black humor they quickly got the reputation of the "world's only acoustic punk band". Then, they recorded their first album "The Permanent Cure works..!" created by the record label Chrysalis Records.

The band played with, among others, Dubliners and various other folk bands at Guinness concerts throughout the country. The band broke with various solo projects in 1998.

The Permanent Cure was back to life in 2007. Leo Gillespie, Patrick Gibbs and Dermot O'Connor left the band, but Thomas Gallagher, Lars Möller and Andreas Plate became new members of the band. It is now performing mainly in Germany.

Discography 
 1975: The Permanent Cure .. works! -- Label; Chrysalis
 1993: Country Archives - Label: SWOM Records, Brunswick
 1993: Bottled label SWOM Records, Brunswick
 1995: Live - Label: SWOM Records, Brunswick
 1997: Four To The Bar: Media Casset, Nümbrecht

Irish folk music